Events during the year 1926 in Northern Ireland.

Incumbents
 Governor - 	 The Duke of Abercorn 
 Prime Minister - James Craig

Events
21 January – The Northern Ireland Minister for Agriculture meets his Free State counterpart, Patrick Hogan. The meeting paves the way for co-operation in securing better animal health for livestock.
18 April – Census held in Northern Ireland (and the Free State).
The population of Northern Ireland is 1,257,000.

Arts and literature

Sport

Football
International
13 February Northern Ireland 3 - 0 Wales
27 February Scotland 4 - 0 Northern Ireland (in Glasgow)
20 October England 3 - 3 Northern Ireland (in Liverpool)
 
Irish League
Winners: Belfast Celtic

Irish Cup
Winners: Belfast Celtic 3 - 2 Linfield

Golf
Royal County Down Golf Club bring in Harry Colt to make further improvements to the course.

Births
20 January – Sarah Conlon, housewife and successful campaigner for the release of the Guildford Four (died 2008).
10 February – Danny Blanchflower, footballer and football manager (died 1993)
10 February – Jack Kyle, international rugby player (died 2014)
6 April – Ian Paisley, founder of the Democratic Unionist Party and First Minister of Northern Ireland from 2007 to 2008 (died 2014)
9 April – Gerry Fitt, first leader of the Social Democratic and Labour Party (died 2005).
15 May – Margaret Guilfoyle, Senator for the state of Victoria (Australia) from 1971 to 1987 (died 2020).
6 June – Johnny McKenna, footballer (died 1980).
23 June – Paddy Doherty, activist (died 2016).
23 September – Stanley McMaster, barrister and Unionist Member of Parliament from 1959 to 1974 (died 1992).
6 November – Frank Carson, comedian (died 2012)

Full date unknown
Gerry Adams, Sr., IRA volunteer, father of Gerry Adams (Sinn Féin President) (died 2003).

Deaths

See also
1926 in Scotland
1926 in Wales

References